Echium rauwolfii is a species of flowering plant in the family Boraginaceae, whose native range is North Africa to the Arabian Peninsula.

Description 
Echium rauwolfii is an annual. It is not a succulent. The leaves are alternate, and have smooth margins. It is found in steppes and deserts.

Delile's protologue (in French) describes it thus:
"The bark of the root  is pink and thin; the stem is straight and branching, 6 decimeters high (2 feet): the radical leaves are ovate-lanceolate, 8 to 16 cm long (3 to 6 inches), narrowed in petiole; the lower branches emerge from the axils of oval-inverted leaves, i a little like a spoon; the upper leaves are linear-oblong, not narrowed in petiole: the stem and twigs are divided into long slender spikes, which successively bear more than thirty to forty flowers.

The calyx has five lanceolate divisions, of which the upper three are widest and biggest.

The stamen filaments are thickened at their base, long like the corolla, brought together with style towards the side of the tube where the blade is more elongated. The style is threadlike, hairy in its lower half, thinned and bifid at the top.

The fruit has four ovoid seeds, triquetrous (triangular in cross-section and sharply angled), white or grey, smooth and shiny.

The whole plant is bristling with white, prickly hairs, which have a thickened base. The tubercles at the base of the hairs develop mainly on the leaves which accompany the fruiting branches, and on the calyces which enlarge with the fruit.

This Echium is very abundant on the dry sandy islands of the Nile, during the months of April and May."

Etymology
The specific epithet, rauwolfii (originally rawolfii) honours Leonhard Rauwolf whom Delile credits with giving a very much earlier description contained in Johann Friedrich Gronovius's, Flora orientalis sive Recensio Plantarum quas Botanicorum Coryphaeus Leonhardus Rauwolffus… observavit, et collegit.(1755)

References

External links
Echium rauwolfii: Flora of Israel online (images and description)

rauwolfii
Flora of Africa
Flora of North Africa
Flora of Israel
Flora of Palestine (region)
Plants described in 1813